Sweet potato pie is a traditional dessert, originating in the Southern United States among the African American community. It is often served during the American holiday season, especially at Thanksgiving and Christmas in place of pumpkin pie, which is more traditional in other regions of the United States. 

It is made in an open pie shell without a top crust. The filling consists of mashed sweet potatoes, evaporated milk, sugar, spices such as nutmeg, and eggs. Other possible ingredients include vanilla or lemon extracts. The baked custard filling may vary from light and silky to dense, depending on the recipe's ratio of sweet potato, milk and eggs.

History
Though creamy vegetable pie recipes date back to Medieval Europe, sweet potato pie appears in the southern United States from the early colonial days. The use of sweet potatoes in Southern and African-American cuisine traces back to Native American cuisine. The sweet potato, which is native to the Americas, was likely used by African slaves as an alternative to the yam found in their homeland. Sweet potato pie applies European pie making customs to the preparation of sweet potatoes. Recipes for sweet potato pie first appeared in printed cookbooks in the 18th century, where it was included with savory vegetable dishes. By the 19th century, sweet potato pie was more commonly classified as a dessert.

One variation is the Hawaiian sweet potato haupia pie.

See also
 Purple sweet potato haupia pie
 Fried sweet potato
 List of custard desserts
 Pie in American cuisine
 List of pies, tarts and flans
 List of sweet potato dishes
 List of regional dishes of the United States
 Sweet potato soup

References

Sweet pies
African-American cuisine
American pies
Cuisine of the Southern United States
Custard desserts
Soul food
Christmas food
Sweet potatoes
Vegetable dishes
Thanksgiving food